Susan Owens is an associate justice of the Washington Supreme Court. Other people with the same name include:
Susie Owens (born 1956), American model and perfumer
Susan Owens (academic) (born 1954), British professor of Environment and Policy
Susan Owens Hickey (born 1955), Chief United States District Judge of the United States District Court for the Western District of Arkansas.

See also
Susan Owen, American operatic soprano